Chettiarpatti is a panchayat town in Virudhunagar district  in the state of Tamil Nadu, India.

Demographics
 India census, Chettiarpatti had a population of 13,508. Males constitute 50% of the population and females 50%. Chettiarpatti has an average literacy rate of 66%, higher than the national average of 59.5%; with male literacy of 75% and female literacy of 58%. 12% of the population is under 6 years of age.

References

Cities and towns in Virudhunagar district